Sierra Leone competed at the 2022 Commonwealth Games held in Birmingham, England. This was Sierra Leone's 13th appearance at the Commonwealth Games.

Joshua Wyse and Hafsatu Kamara served as the country's opening ceremony flagbearers.

Competitors
The following is the list of number of competitors participating at the Games per sport/discipline.

Athletics

Men
Track and road events

Women
Track and road events

Badminton

Boxing

Judo

A squad of two judoka was entered as of 7 July 2022.

Men

Swimming

Men

Women

Table tennis

Sierra Leone was awarded a bipartite quota in the men's C3–5 event in para-table tennis.

Parasport

Wrestling

Repechage Format

References

External links
Birmingham 2022 Commonwealth Games Official site

2022
Nations at the 2022 Commonwealth Games
2022 in Sierra Leonean sport